"Kaelakee hääl" ("Voice of the necklace") is a song performed by Maarja-Liis Ilus and Ivo Linna that represented  in the Eurovision Song Contest 1996.

In the Estonian preselection Eurolaul, the winner was selected from 13 entries by an international jury.

The song was performed eleventh in Eurovision, following 's Mariana Efstratiou with "Emis Forame To Himona Anixiatika" and preceding 's Elisabeth Andreassen with "I evighet". At the close of voting, it had received 94 points, placing it 5th out of 23.

On stage with Maarja-Liis Ilus and Ivo Linna were instrumentalists Taavo Remmel (bass), Glen Pilvre (keyboards) and Roland Puusepp (drums). Backing vocal was provided by Anne Värvimann.

It was succeeded as Estonian representative at the 1997 contest by Ilus, performing solo, with "Keelatud maa".

While not resulting in a win, the performance was the first occasion on which a former Soviet state had placed in the top 5.

The female solo had not been written for Maarja-Liis Ilus in the first place but for another popular singer, Evelin Samuel who had to turn the offer down for an upcoming tour in Japan. Priit Pajusaar then asked Ilus at short notice. She then recorded her parts whilst Evelin Samuel got her tour cancelled shortly after the replacement.

Ilus and Linna did not meet in person until actually performing the song on stage. Even then, during Eurolaul final, Linna was on a tour and Maarja-Liis Ilus had to mime to Ivo Linna on a big screen.

Translations
Two English versions were made of the song, the first "Away from Home", sung by Ilus and Linna, and the second titled "Just a Dream Away", which was recorded by Ilus and Swedish singer Mojje in 1997 for Ilus' album First in Line. Ilus also recorded the latter with Greek singer Yiorgos Doukas (Duke), including a version with some Greek lyrics added in, titled "Pali esena that onirefto".

Cover versions have been made in various languages, including in Finnish and Swedish, and a Spanish version by a group from the United States.

References

Eurovision songs of Estonia
Eurovision songs of 1996
Male–female vocal duets
1996 songs
Maarja-Liis Ilus songs